Aksyon Radyo U.S. Newsbureau is a defunct Cebu City AM station and current internet radio station owned by Manila Broadcasting Company. The station's studio is located at Garden Grove, California.

Aksyon Radyo U.S. Newsbureau was known as DYXR-Aksyon Radyo Cebu from 1999 to 2010, when MBC bought back the callsign DYRC.

History
In 1999, after DYRC ceased its operations due to financial difficulties, the station was bought under new management by Padayon Pilipino Media Consultancy Services Inc. and changed its callsign to DYXR. Thus, this was the born of Aksyon Radyo Cebu.

Under new management, the station became Aksyon Radyo, together with all local AM stations under MBC. The station used to be located at Brgy. Tangke, Talisay City.

On September 21, 2010, MBC came back its call sign, DYRC. Padayon Pilipino Media decided to transition the Aksyon Radyo Cebu into cyberspace with its new studios located at Garden Cove, California.

See also
 Pacific Broadcasting System
 List of Manila Broadcasting Company stations

References

External links
 Official Website of Aksyon Radyo U.S. Newsbureau

Internet radio stations in the Philippines
Radio stations established in 2010